Palora is a town in the Morona Santiago province of Ecuador. It is the seat of the Palora Canton.

Idioma oficial: Español

References 
 www.inec.gov.ec

Populated places in Morona-Santiago Province